Invisible Tonight is the debut album by the American rock band The Nearly Deads. The album release was funded with a kickstarter project and was released on June 24, 2014.

Kickstarter
The Nearly Deads launched their kickstarter project on April 17, 2014. The goal of the project was to fund the release of the album and the tour. The project reached over $2,200 of their $10,000 goal within the first 24 hours alone. The project closed on June 16 with an amount of $13,006 from 274 backers.

Track listing

Personnel
"TJ" Theresa Jeane – vocals, keyboards
Steven Tobi – lead guitar
Kevin Koelsch – bass
Javier Garza Jr – rhythm guitar
Josh Perrone – drums

References 

2014 debut albums
The Nearly Deads albums
Kickstarter-funded albums